Susanna Mildred Hill was an American confidence trickster who fooled potential suitors. In the 1940s, as a 60-year-old mother, but posing as a beautiful young woman in her twenties, she was able to convince hundreds of men to send numerous gifts to their "pen-pal". This confidence trick has since become known as the "Lonely Hearts Scam".

See also
Romance scam

External links
Museum of Hoaxes article

American fraudsters
1880s births
Year of birth missing
Year of death missing
Place of birth missing
Place of death missing